

 by Hayashi Shihei (1738–1793) was published in Japan in 1785. This book represents one of the earliest attempts to define Japan in terms of its outer boundaries.  It represented a modern effort to distinguish Japan from the neighboring nations.

The book describes those three surrounding nations: the Joseon Dynasty (Korea), the Ryukyu Kingdom (Ryukyu Islands/Okinawa) and Ezo (Hokkaido), as well as the yet uninhabited Bonin Islands.

A copy of the Sangoku Tsūran Zusetsu was brought to Europe by Isaac Titsingh. In Paris, the text represented the first appearance of Korean han'gŭl in Europe. After Titsingh's death, the printed original and Titsingh's translation were purchased by Jean-Pierre Abel-Rémusat at the Collège de France, wherethrough a series of errors on Abel-Rémusat's partit gave the Bonin Islands their name. After Rémusat's death, Julius Klaproth at the Institut Royal in Paris published his version of Titsingh's work.  In  1832, the Oriental Translation Fund of Great Britain and Ireland supported the posthumous abridged publication of Titsingh's French translation.

See also 
 List of Japanese classic texts
 Bonin Islands

References

Citations

Bibliography
 .
 .
 .
 .
 .
 .
 {{citation |last=Vos |first=Ken |date=2006 |url=http://www.rmv.nl/publicaties/11Koreavroeg/e/accidentalacquisitions.pdf |title=Accidental Acquisitions: The Nineteenth-Century Korean Collections in the National Museum of Ethnology, Part 1" |location= |publisher=National Museum of Ethnology |archive-url=https://web.archive.org/web/20120622021232/http://www.rmv.nl/publicaties/11Koreavroeg/e/accidentalacquisitions.pdf |archive-date=2012-06-22 }}.

External links
 Waseda University — Hayashi Shihei. (1785). 三国通覧図説 (Sangoku Tsuran Zusetsu'')

Edo-period works
Historiography of Japan
1785 non-fiction books
1785 in Asia
Historiography of Korea